Asha Smara Darra (born Oscar Septianus Lawalata, 1 September 1977) is an Indonesian fashion designer. She studied fashion at schools in Jakarta. She finished half of the 3-year term and then quit during the monetary crisis in 1998. She opened her own boutique along with her partner Novie.

References 

Living people
1977 births
Indonesian fashion designers
Indonesian women fashion designers